Skripovo is a rural locality (a village) in Tarasovskoye Rural Settlement of Plesetsky District, Arkhangelsk Oblast, Russia. The population was 2 as of 2010.

Geography 
Skripovo is located on the Shorda River, 100 km east of Plesetsk (the district's administrative centre) by road. Maslennikova is the nearest rural locality.

References 

Rural localities in Plesetsky District